King Edward VI Handsworth Wood Girls' Academy is a secondary school and sixth form located in Handsworth Wood, Birmingham, England. The building that the school currently occupies used to be known as Handsworth Wood Boys' School but it went through a change over ten years ago. The headteacher is Mr Qamar Riaz.

Originally known as Handsworth Wood Girls School, in November 2012 the school converted to academy status and was renamed Handsworth Wood Girls' Academy. In September 2018 the school joined the Foundation of the Schools of King Edward VI and was renamed King Edward VI Handsworth Wood Girls' Academy.

References

External links
King Edward VI Handsworth Wood Girls' Academy official website

Girls' schools in the West Midlands (county)
Secondary schools in Birmingham, West Midlands
Educational institutions established in 1957
1957 establishments in England
Academies in Birmingham, West Midlands